Classic FM (styled as CLASSIC M) is one of the United Kingdom's three Independent National Radio stations and is owned and operated by Global. The station broadcasts classical music and was launched in 1992.

Classic FM was the first national classical music station to launch since the opening of BBC Radio 3, 25 years earlier, in September 1967, and 46 years since the opening of Radio 3's predecessor, The Third Programme, in September 1946. 

, the station has a weekly audience of 4.9million listeners.

Overview
Classic FM broadcasts nationally on FM, DAB digital radio, Freeview, satellite and cable television and is available internationally by streaming audio over the internet. It is the only Independent National Radio station to broadcast on FM alongside BBC Radios 1, 2, 3 and 4. In addition to playing a wide, traditional classical repertoire, the station also features film scores and video game music.

History

The idea for a national, commercial FM network devoted to classical music originated with the management at GWR group, an entrepreneurial group of UK commercial radio stations. It had been operating a trial programme on its AM frequencies in Wiltshire and Bristol, testing audience reaction to a regular drive-time programme of popular classical music. It proved successful, and the company's CEO, Ralph Bernard, and programme director, Michael Bukht, drew up the plans for a national station.

Meanwhile, Brian Brolly, formerly the CEO of Andrew Lloyd Webber's Really Useful Group, had a similar idea in 1990. After failing to raise sufficient funds for the project, Brolly's consortium was approached by the GWR Group, and the two merged. The UK Government had decided to award several new national radio licences, and invited tenders. Brolly had brought the idea to Rick Senat, the long-serving head of business affairs in London for Warner Bros. and current owner of Hammer Films. Initially rejected by Warner Bros., Senat showed the project to the President of Time Warner International Broadcasting, Tom McGrath, a former classical musician and conductor. Time Warner agreed to back the project, but was prohibited under then current UK law from owning more than a 25% interest.

GWR created a business plan which was supported by its major shareholder, DMGT, publishers of the Daily Mail. An internal dispute over ownership of the licence was resolved, and the consortium was completed after Time Warner agreed to back GWR's plans for the station. As time was running out to raise the £6m needed to launch the station, the GWR investment team spent two days presenting to and finally persuading private investor Sir Peter Michael to back the plan with a 30% investment. The founding shareholder group that launched Classic FM was Sir Peter Michael and Time Warner (each with over 30%), GWR (17%), DMGT (5%) and several other smaller shareholders. The Radio Authority had granted an exemption so that Time Warner could hold more than 25%, provided a UK citizen/corporation was larger in the shareholding group.

The station launched at 06:00 on Monday 7 September 1992, after two months of test transmissions using a recording of birdsong. Nick Bailey presented the first programme, and Zadok the Priest by George Frideric Handel was the first piece to be played. Other launch presenters included Henry Kelly, Susannah Simons, Petroc Trelawny and Adrian Love.

The station rejected the "Radio 3" style of presentation, and took inspiration from New York City's WNYC and the now-defunct WGMS in Washington, D.C., with their more populist mix of talk, light classical music, new artists and crossover classical records.

Global, the UK's largest radio station ownership group, now owns the station. Classic FM has broadcast from its current studios, on the second floor of 30 Leicester Square in central London, since March 2006. The first programme to be broadcast live from there was Mark Griffiths' programme on Sunday 26 March 2006.

In April and May 2017, High Score, the first series on UK radio dedicated to video game music, was first broadcast on Classic FM. According to the station's website, it became "the most popular programme on 'Listen Again' in Classic FM’s 25-year history". It was presented by composer Jessica Curry.

Current Notable Presenters

Regular Presenters 
 Bill Overton
 Lucy Coward
 Alexander Armstrong 
 Anne-Marie Minhall
 John Brunning
 Zeb Soanes
 Margherita Taylor 
 Katie Breathwick 
 Sam Pittis
 Alan Titchmarsh
 Aled Jones
 Moira Stuart
 Jonathan Ross
 David Mellor
 Myleene Klass
 Andrew Marr
 Catherine Bott 
 John Humphrys
 Charlotte Hawkins

Occasional Presenters
 John Suchet
 Karthi Gnanasegaram
 Sir Trevor McDonald
  Nicholas Owen
 Debbie Wiseman
 Fiona Bruce
 Chi-chi Nwanoku
 Dr Alex George

Hall of Fame

Classic FM's "Hall of Fame" is broadcast annually over the four days of the Easter weekend. First broadcast in 1996, the show counts down the 300 most-popular pieces as voted for by listeners, culminating in the number one on the evening of Easter Monday.

The number one spot was occupied until 2001 by Max Bruch's Violin Concerto No. 1, and then by Rachmaninoff's Piano Concerto No. 2.
In 2006 the top spot was taken by Mozart's Clarinet Concerto. From 2007 to 2010, the top place on the Hall of Fame was taken by Ralph Vaughan Williams's The Lark Ascending. The 2011 "Hall of Fame" saw Rachmaninov's Piano Concerto No. 2 return to the top spot, ending Vaughan Williams' four-year run, and held the position again in 2012 and 2013. In 2014 The Lark Ascending replaced Rachmaninov, which slipped back to number 2 and remained number 1 through to 2017.

In 2018, the top spot was taken by Pyotr Ilyich Tchaikovsky's 1812 Overture, Rachmaninov's Piano Concerto No. 2 was a non-mover in second place, and Vaughan Williams' The Lark Ascending descended to third place after a four-year run at no. 1.

In the 2019 Hall of Fame, Vaughan Williams's The Lark Ascending reclaimed the top spot, followed by Rachmaninoff's Piano Concerto No. 2 and Edward Elgar's Enigma Variations at second and third respectively. 2020 and 2021's Hall Of Fame also saw The Lark Ascending voted the most popular piece by Classic FM listeners.

Nation's Favourite Christmas Carol
Classic FM broadcasts the "Nation's Favourite Christmas Carol" in a similar format to the "Hall of Fame". The show counts down the thirty most popular Christmas carols every Christmas Day between 13:00 and 15:00, as voted for by listeners. It began in 2001, with "In the Bleak Midwinter" winning the first vote. The following year, Silent Night was voted the nation's favourite. The vote has been won by O Holy Night in almost every year since then, with the only other winner being Silent Night in 2014 and 2015.

Classic FM Chart
From the station's launch in September 1992 until the end of 2019, Classic FM broadcast a weekly classical chart show. Initially transmitted on Saturday mornings, the programme later moved to Sunday teatimes. The final chart show was aired on 21 December 2019.

Composer in residence
Classic FM named a composer in residence in 2004, Joby Talbot. Talbot composed a piece, scored for up to five instruments, each month for the year of his residence. The compositions were also premiered on Classic FM. The twelve compositions form part of a larger piece, released on a CD entitled Once Around the Sun on 23 May 2005.

Talbot was succeeded by Patrick Hawes as the new composer in residence in 2006 and composed the piano album Towards the Light during his residency. In May 2008 Howard Goodall, the composer and television presenter, joined Classic FM as the station's latest composer in residence. Goodall also presented a new programme on the station, Howard Goodall on..., beginning on 7 June 2008.

Debbie Wiseman was named composer in residence in 2015. Her first album commissioned for Classic FM was The Musical Zodiac, which was released the following year.

Sponsorship
Classic FM were sponsors of Queens Park Rangers Football Club between 1992 and 1994.

Charity: The Classic FM Foundation
The Classic FM Foundation is a grant giving charity which raises money to fund music education and music therapy projects working with children and adults throughout the UK. It was founded in 2006 as Classic FM Music Makers, and was renamed in 2010.

Hayley Westenra is an ambassador of the charity, which also receives support from many famous faces from the world of classical music and entertainment.

Throughout the year The Classic FM Foundation holds fundraising events including concerts, sponsored treks and an annual appeal.

Other media
Classic FM ran an internet television (and formerly digital TV) channel playing classical music videos, Classic FM TV.
Classic FM published a monthly magazine, Classic FM Magazine, which presented news and reviews.
Classic FM has also issued a series of CDs with selected classical pieces, notably two CDs of Classic FM Music for Babies (playtime and bedtime) and Classic FM Music for Bathtime.
Classic FM produces a podcast called Case Notes (winner of the British Podcast Awards Best True Crime Podcast 2019), presenting stories from the history of classical music.

Jazz on Classic FM
On 25 December 2006, Classic FM opened "theJazz", a station devoted to jazz music. The station closed in March 2008, and Classic FM itself then took on the broadcasting of a jazz programme every night between midnight and 02:00, until September 2008.

References

External links

British classical music radio programmes
Classic FM
Classic FM
Classical music radio stations
Radio stations established in 1992
1992 establishments in the United Kingdom
Global Radio
Classic FM (UK)